Hestina is a genus of butterflies in the family Nymphalidae subfamily Apaturinae. The genus is found in the East Palearctic and Southeast Asia.

Known larval food plants are Celtis and, for one species, Trema (Ulmaceae). These include Celtis boninensis Japan, Celtis formosana Taiwan, Celtis nervosa Taiwan, Celtis jessoensis, Celtis sinensis, Trema orientalis. Hestina nama larvae feed on Oreocnide (Urticaceae).

Species
In alphabetical order:
Hestina assimilis (Linnaeus, 1758)
Hestina dissimilis Hall, 1935
Hestina divona (Hewitson, 1861) – Sulawesi sorcerer
Hestina japonica (C. & R. Felder, 1862)
Hestina jermyni Druce, 1911
Hestina mena Moore, 1858
Hestina mimetica Butler, 1874
Hestina nama (Doubleday, 1844) – Circe
Hestina namoides de Nicéville, 1900
Hestina nicevillei (Moore, [1895])
Hestina ouvradi Riley, 1939
Hestina persimilis (Westwood, [1850]) – Siren 
Hestina risna
Hestina waterstradti Watkins, 1928

External links
"Hestina Westwood, [1850]" at Markku Savela's Lepidoptera and Some Other Life Forms

Apaturinae
Nymphalidae genera
Taxa named by John O. Westwood